Ronald Timothy Renton, Baron Renton of Mount Harry,  (28 May 1932 – 25 August 2020) was a British Conservative politician.

Early life
Tim Renton, who rarely used his first name of Ronald, was born in London. He won scholarships to Eton College and Magdalen College, Oxford, and graduated with a first-class degree in History.

Parliamentary career
After unsuccessfully contesting Sheffield Park in 1970, he was Conservative Member of Parliament for Mid-Sussex from 1974 to 1997.

He served as a Minister of State in both the Foreign Office and the Home Office, and served as Margaret Thatcher's Chief Whip (Parliamentary Secretary to the Treasury) between 1989 and 1990. Following Thatcher's resignation in 1990 he served in John Major's government as Minister for the Arts between 1990 and 1992. During this time, he came up with the idea of  a National Lottery. This was later adopted as a government policy. He launched National Music Day (UK) with Mick Jagger which ran from 1992 until around 1997. He served as Parliamentary Private Secretary to Geoffrey Howe and to John Biffen, the Trade Secretary but resigned from that position in 1981 after he refused to support the government on a vote about a retrospective windfall tax on bank profits.

After standing down from the Commons at the 1997 General Election, he was created a life peer in the 1997 Dissolution Honours; on 9 June 1997 as Baron Renton of Mount Harry, of Offham in the County of East Sussex, and took his seat in the House of Lords. He retired from the House on 14 April 2016.

Personal life
In 1960, he married Alice Blanche Helen Fergusson, daughter of Sir James Fergusson, 8th Baronet of Kilkerran. The couple lived in Offham near Lewes in East Sussex and had a holiday home on the Hebridean island of Tiree.

Their four surviving children are Alex Renton, a journalist and author, Christian Louise, Daniel Charles Antony, an environmentalist, and (Katherine) Chelsea, who is an artist and author. The couple's youngest daughter, Polly Renton (Penelope Sally Rosita), a documentary film maker, died in a car accident in 2010.

Renton died from cancer at his home in Offham on 25 August 2020, aged 88.

Bibliography
The Dangerous Edge, Hutchinson, 1994, 
Hostage to Fortune, Arrow, 1998, 
Chief Whip, Politico's, 2005,

References

|-

|-

|-

1932 births
2020 deaths
Alumni of Magdalen College, Oxford
Conservative Party (UK) MPs for English constituencies
Conservative Party (UK) life peers
Deaths from cancer in England
Deputy Lieutenants of East Sussex
Members of the Privy Council of the United Kingdom
People educated at Eton College
People from Hamsey
UK MPs 1974
UK MPs 1974–1979
UK MPs 1979–1983
UK MPs 1983–1987
UK MPs 1987–1992
UK MPs 1992–1997
Life peers created by Elizabeth II